De Caro may refer to:

Places 
 Serra de Caro, the highest mountain of the Ports de Tortosa-Beseit, Catalonia, Spain

People 

 Antonio de Caro (died 1517), Italian Roman Catholic  Bishop of Nardò and of Avellino e Frigento (1505–1507)
 Baldassarre De Caro (1689–1750), Italian painter of still lifes, mainly of hunted game and flowers
 Carlos Moreno de Caro (born 1946), Colombian politician, Ambassador of Colombia to South Africa, and Councilman of Bogotá
 Francisco de Caro (1898–1976), Argentinian pianist and composer
 Gerolamo de Caro (died 1560), Italian  Roman Catholic Titular Archbishop of Nazareth (1536–1552), Titular Bishop of Cannae (1531–1536)
 Julio de Caro (1899–1980), Argentinian composer, musician and conductor prominent in the Tango genre
 Lorenzo de Caro (1719–1777), Italian painter
 Lucio De Caro (born 1922), Italian former screenwriter and film director
 Mario De Caro (born 1963), Italian philosopher specialized in the field of moral philosophy
 Raffaele De Caro (1883–1961), Italian politician

See also 
 DeCaro (disambiguation)